Danielle Wood may refer to:
 Danielle Wood (writer)
 Danielle Wood (engineer)